The IMOCA 60 Class yacht Ecover 3 was designed by Owen Clark Design and launched in September 2006 after being made by Hakes Marine based in New Zealand. The boat is a sistership to Aviva.

Racing Results

References 

2000s sailing yachts
Sailing yachts designed by Owen Clarke Design
Sailing yachts designed by Merfyn Owen
Sailing yachts designed by Allen Clarke
Vendée Globe boats
IMOCA 60
Sailboat types built in New Zealand